Mulligan Meets Monk is a studio album by American jazz pianist Thelonious Monk and baritone saxophonist Gerry Mulligan, originally released on Riverside Records in 1957. It has been reissued numerous times. It was remastered for CD in 1987 (on Fantasy's Original Jazz Classics) with three additional alternative takes from the original session.

Track listing

Original LP (1957) 
Side One
 "'Round Midnight" (Monk, Cootie Williams, Bernie Hanighen) – 8:29
 "Rhythm-a-Ning" (Monk) – 5:19
 "Sweet and Lovely" (Gus Arnheim, Jules LeMare, Harry Tobias) – 7:17
Side Two
 "Decidedly" (Gerry Mulligan) – 5:54
 "Straight, No Chaser" (Monk) – 7:00
 "I Mean You" (Monk, Coleman Hawkins) – 6:53

Digital re-release (1987) 
 "'Round Midnight" – 8:29
 "Rhythm-a-Ning" – 5:19
 "Sweet and Lovely" – 7:17
 "Decidedly" (original stereo take 4) – 5:54
 "Decidedly" (original mono take 5)  – 6:37
 "Straight, No Chaser" (original take 3) – 7:00
 "Straight, No Chaser" (alternate take 1) – 5:29
 "I Mean You" (original take 4) – 6:53
 "I Mean You" (alternate take 2) – 6:30

Personnel 
Musicians
 Gerry Mulligan – baritone saxophone
 Thelonious Monk – piano
 Wilbur Ware – double bass
 Shadow Wilson – drums

Production
 Orrin Keepnews - producer, liner notes
 Jack Higgins - recording engineer
 Robert Parent - cover photo
 Paul Bacon - cover design

For the CD-release (1987) 
 Phil De Lancie - digital remastering
 Peter Grant - design

References 

1957 albums
Thelonious Monk albums
Gerry Mulligan albums
Riverside Records albums
Albums produced by Orrin Keepnews
Albums with cover art by Paul Bacon